Park Lane Shopper's Boulevard is a shopping area and visitor attraction along Nathan Road in Tsim Sha Tsui, Kowloon, Hong Kong near Kowloon Park and Tsim Sha Tsui and Jordan stations. It was completed in 1986.

References

External links
 

Shopping districts and streets in Hong Kong
Tsim Sha Tsui